Dichloroisocyanuric acid, also known as dichlor or dichloro-s-triazinetrione and is marketed under many names (e.g. troclosene), is a chemical compound with the formula (C(O)NCl)2(C(O)NH).

Synthesis
Dichloroisocyanuric acid is manufactured by chlorination of cyanuric acid:
(C(O)NH)3  +  2 Cl2   →   (C(O)NCl)2(C(O)NH)  +  2 HCl
It is a colourless solid.

Mechanism of action

Dichloroisocyanuric acid is an oxidizer, reacting with water to form chlorine gas.

Although the bleaching agent in most chlorine based bleach is sodium hypochlorite, the sodium salt of dichloroisocyanuric acid, sodium dichloroisocyanurate, is the active ingredient in commercial disinfectant bacteriocides, algicides, and cleaning agents such as the pulverized cleanser Comet.

See also
 Trichloroisocyanuric acid (trichlor)

References

Antimicrobials
Organochlorides
Organic acids
Bleaches
Isocyanuric acids